Jens-Uwe Zöphel (born 23 June 1969) is a German former footballer who played as a midfielder. Zöphel joined the youth academy of football club BFC Dynamo in 1983. He made his first appearance with the first team of BFC Dynamo in the 12th matchday of the 1988-89 DDR-Oberliga against FC Carl Zeiss Jena on 19 November 1988. He would then make recurring appearances with the first team during the second half of the season. Zöphel won the FDGB-Pokal with BFC Dynamo in 1989. He then made one appearance for BFC Dynamo in the 1989-90 European Cup Winners' Cup. Zöphel was part of the starting line-up in the return leg of the second round against AS Monaco at the Friedrich-Ludwig-Jahn-Sportpark on 1 November 1989.

External links
Career stats

1969 births
Living people
German footballers
East German footballers
East Germany under-21 international footballers
Berliner FC Dynamo players
FC Energie Cottbus players
1. FC Union Berlin players
SV Wacker Burghausen players
Dresdner SC players
SV Germania Schöneiche players
DDR-Oberliga players
Association football midfielders
Sportspeople from Prenzlau
Footballers from Brandenburg
People from Bezirk Neubrandenburg